Sankt Anton (“Saint Anthony”) may refer to the following places in Austria:

Sankt Anton am Arlberg, a municipality and ski resort in Tyrol 
Sankt Anton im Montafon, a municipality in Vorarlberg
Sankt Anton an der Jeßnitz, a municipality in Lower Austria